"Make a Movie" is the first single and a popular song from American rapper Twista's eighth studio album, The Perfect Storm. It was released on August 24, 2010. The track charted in the United States and a music video was shot.

Background 
The song was put down as being unoriginal, as there been other songs titled "Make a Movie" about making sex tapes, such as "Make a Movie" by Chamillionaire, which Twista is featured on. The original version of the track featured T-Pain on the hook but the final version features Chris Brown. The collaboration was said to be unexpected and geared towards a pop audience. Twista explained that the collaboration came around due to mutual respect between the two. The song was described by Rap-Up as "Twista spiting his rapid flow while Chris Brown croons over the seductive track."

Critical reception 
The critical reception to "Make A Movie" was generally mixed. AllMusic's David Jeffries was also critical: "when Twista compares his shutter speed to his sex speed on 'Make a Movie', it's a cringe-worthy moment even R. Kelly would avoid". DJBooth.net also wrote a mixed review: "Make a Movie, a quasi-R rated jam that brings on recovering superstar Chris Brown for a Kardashian inspired ode to cinematic intercourse. Like much of Twista's more radio ready work, it's not particularly impressive, but unless you're dead set against having a good time you won't be able to stop your head from nodding." William E. Ketchum III of HipHopDX wrote a more positive review: "Even though 'Make A Movie' is formulaic, it wins with its cheesy porno references, a solid Chris Brown chorus, and a silky instrumental." RapReviews was also positive about the song: "there are songs like 'Make a Movie' featuring Chris Brown which harken back to the freak flop flow of 'Slow Jamz', with the perfectly contradictory combination of fast slung lyrics to slow quiet storm grooves."

Music video 
The music video debuted on MTV on September 8, 2010. It was directed by Colin Tilley. It was described as tame compared to the subject matter.

Charts

Weekly charts

Year-end charts

Release history

References

2010 singles
Twista songs
Chris Brown songs
EMI Records singles
Songs written by T-Pain
Songs written by Twista
2010 songs
Songs written by The Legendary Traxster